Carlos Eduardo Cabezas Jurado (born November 14, 1980) is a Spanish professional basketball player for Alba Fehérvár. He is the nephew of the former Uruguayan professional footballer Hugo Cabezas, who played in Spain in the late 70s. His father (Hugo's brother), and his grandfather, are also former Uruguayan professional basketball players. He is a 1.87 m (6 ft 1 ¾ in) tall point guard.

Professional career
Cabezas began his playing career with the youth teams of Unicaja Málaga in Spain. He made his professional debut during the 1998–99 season with Unicaja Macías, the reserve team of Unicaja Málaga, in the Spanish EBA League (Spanish 2nd division). He then moved to the LEB club Circulo Badajoz during the 1999–00 season. He joined the senior top-tier level Spanish ACB League club Unicaja Málaga in 2000.

The Orlando Magic of the NBA invited Cabezas to play for their NBA Summer League team at the Orlando Pro Summer League in 2009, but he declined the offer. He joined the Russian Super League club Khimki Moscow Region in 2009. In October 2010, he signed a one-year contract with Spanish club CAI Zaragoza.

On September 1, 2012, Cabezas signed with the EuroLeague club Caja Laboral. He left the club in February, officially due to technical reasons, but several media sources claimed he was fired by the club.

On August 3, 2016, he signed with Spanish club Baloncesto Fuenlabrada. On October 26, 2016, he parted ways with Fuenlabrada. On November 9, 2016, he signed a short-term deal with French club Orléans Loiret Basket. On April 15, 2017, Cabezas signed with the Spanish team Real Betis Energía Plus for the rest of the season.

In November 2017, he signed with Guaros de Lara.

On August 31, 2021, Cabezas announced his retirement from professional basketball.

Spain national team
With the junior national teams of Spain, Cabezas won the gold medal at the 1998 FIBA Europe Under-18 Championship, the gold medal at the 1999 FIBA Under-19 World Championship, and the bronze medal at the 2000 FIBA Europe Under-20 Championship. He also played at the 2001 FIBA Under-21 World Championship.

He played with the senior Spain national basketball team at the EuroBasket 2005. Cabezas won the gold medal with the senior Spain national basketball team, at the 2006 FIBA World Championship. He also won the silver medal at the EuroBasket 2007, and the gold medal at the EuroBasket 2009.

References

External links
 ACB.com Profile 
 Euroleague.net Profile
 Eurobasket.com Profile
 FIBA Archive Profile
 FIBA Game Center Profile
 FIBA Europe Profile

1980 births
Living people
2006 FIBA World Championship players
Alba Fehérvár players
Baloncesto Fuenlabrada players
Baloncesto Málaga players
Basket Zaragoza players
BC Khimki players
CB Murcia players
FIBA World Championship-winning players
Guaros de Lara (basketball) players
Liga ACB players
Orléans Loiret Basket players
Point guards
Real Betis Baloncesto players
Regatas Corrientes basketball players
Saski Baskonia players
Spanish expatriate basketball people in France
Spanish expatriate basketball people in Russia
Spanish expatriate sportspeople in Venezuela
Spanish men's basketball players
Spanish people of Uruguayan descent
Sportspeople from Málaga
Club Nacional de Football (basketball) players